A flea is a parasitic insect.

Flea may also refer to:

People
Flea (musician), the stage name of Michael Balzary, bassist of Red Hot Chili Peppers
Darryl Virostko, professional surfer nicknamed "Flea"
Flea, the former alias of Australian hip-hop artist and Lgeez member Alex Jones

Literature and fiction
The Flea (poem), a poem by John Donne
The Flea (character), a character from the animated TV series ¡Mucha Lucha!
The Flea (fairy tale), a fairy tale by Giambattista Basile
Flea (Chrono Trigger), a video game character
"Fleas" (poem), a common alias for "Lines on the Antiquity of Microbes"
"Fleas (The Good Wife)", a first season episode of The Good Wife

Other uses
Cat flea, Ctenocephalides felis, whose primary host are domestic cats
Snow flea, small jumping insects in the order Collembola and a term sometimes also used for wingless scorpionflies in the family Boreidae
Water flea, any of several small aquatic crustacea
FLEA (psychedelic), a psychedelic phenethylamine
Fuel fleas, microscopic particles of radioactive nuclear fuel
Stir bar, sometimes known as a flea, a bar magnet used as part of a magnetic stirrer to stir solutions in a laboratory

See also
 Flee (disambiguation)

Animal common name disambiguation pages